Yabūchi, Yabuchi or Yabuuchi (written: 薮内, 藪内, 籔内 or やぶうち in hiragana) is a Japanese surname. Notable people with the surname include:

, Japanese basketball player
, Japanese manga artist

Japanese-language surnames